The Ariel Award for Best Actor (Spanish: Premio Ariel a Mejor Actor) is an award presented by the Academia Mexicana de Artes y Ciencias Cinematográficas (AMACC) in Mexico. It is given in honor of an actor who has delivered an outstanding performance in a leading role while working within the Mexican film industry. In 1947, the 1st and 2nd Ariel Awards were held, with Domingo Soler and David Silva winning for the films La Barraca and Campeón Sin Corona, respectively. With the exception of the years 1959 to 1971, when the Ariel Awards were suspended, the award has been given annually. Nominees and winners are determined by a committee formed every year consisting of academy members (active and honorary), previous winners and individuals with at least two Ariel nominations; the committee members submit their votes through the official AMACC website.

Since its inception, the award has been given to 49 actors. Damián Alcázar has received the most awards in this category with five Ariels and also is the most nominated performer with eight nominations; Arturo de Córdova and Pedro Infante follow with seven nominations each. Actors Pedro Armendáriz and Pedro Armendáriz, Jr., father and son, also won the award for Best Actor. In 1972, Alfonso Arau won for his self-directed leading role in El Águila Descalza. Spanish actor Javier Bardem was nominated in 2011 for his performance in Biutiful, for which he was also nominated for the Academy Award and a BAFTA Award, and won the Goya and the Prix d'interprétation masculine at the Cannes Film Festival.

Six films have featured two nominated performances for Best Actor, De Todos Modos Juan Te Llamas (Jorge Russek and Juan Ferrara), Cuartelazo (Héctor Ortega and Bruno Rey), Vidas Errantes (José Carlos Ruiz and Ignacio Guadalupe), Chido Guan, El Tacos de Oro (Fernando Arau and Mario Almada), Dulces Compañías (Roberto Cobo and Ramiro Huerta), and 600 Millas (Kristyan Ferrer and Tim Roth); Russek and Ruiz won the award. As of the 2022 ceremony, Raúl Briones is the most recent winner for his role in the film Una Película de Policías.

Winners and nominees

Multiple wins and nominations 

The following individuals have received multiple Best Actor awards:

The following actors received four or more Best Actor nominations:

See also 
 Academy Award for Best Actor
 Best Actor Award (Cannes Film Festival)

References

Ariel Awards
Film awards for lead actor